Communications Act may refer to:

 The Communications Act of 1934 in the United States
 The Communications Act 2003 in the United Kingdom

See also 

 List of short titles